Someone searching for a list of Christian Scientists might be searching for...

List of Christian thinkers in science – Which lists scientists who are also noted for their commitment to Christian thought.
List of Christian Scientists (religious denomination) – Which lists notable members of The First Church of Christ, Scientist.